Events in the year 1940 in Portugal.

Incumbents
President: Óscar Carmona
Prime Minister: António de Oliveira Salazar

Events
Portuguese Mathematical Society founded

Arts and entertainment

Sports

Births
11 March – Sebastião Alba, poet (d. 2000)
30 July – Nicolau Breyner, playwright and actor (d. 2016)

Full date missing
Ana Vieira, artist (d. 2016)

Deaths

28 June – António Ginestal Machado, politician (born 1874)

Full date missing

Abel Fontoura da Costa, colonial administrator (born 1869).

References

 
1940s in Portugal
Years of the 20th century in Portugal